The 2020 Copa Libertadores Final was the final match which decided the winner of the 2020 Copa Libertadores, the 61st edition of the Copa Libertadores, South American's top-tier continental club football tournament organized by CONMEBOL.

The match was played on 30 January 2021 at the Maracanã in Rio de Janeiro, Brazil, between Brazilian teams Palmeiras and Santos.

The final was originally scheduled to be played on 21 November 2020. However, as the tournament had been interrupted since March 2020 due to the COVID-19 pandemic, CONMEBOL announced on 10 July 2020 that the final would be rescheduled to be played in late January 2021, with 23, 24 or 30 January being the possible dates. Eventually, on 23 November 2020, CONMEBOL confirmed that the final would be played on 30 January 2021.

Palmeiras defeated Santos by a 1–0 score to win their second Copa Libertadores title. As champions, Palmeiras qualified for the 2020 FIFA Club World Cup in Qatar, and earned the right to play against the winners of the 2020 Copa Sudamericana in the 2021 Recopa Sudamericana. They also automatically qualified for the 2021 Copa Libertadores group stage.

Due to pandemic precautions, attendance was limited to 5,000 spectators.

Venue
The second Copa Libertadores final played as a single match at a pre-determined venue was held at Maracanã in Rio de Janeiro, Brazil. This was the 34th Copa libertadores final match to took place in Brazil, and the fifth to took place in Rio de Janeiro, four of them at Maracanã and one at Estádio São Januário. The Maracanã previously hosted the first leg of the 1963 and 1981 finals and the second leg of the 2008 finals.

Host selection
On 15 October 2019, CONMEBOL announced eight venues from three national associations that reached the final stage of the bidding process to host the 2020 final:

On 17 October 2019, CONMEBOL announced that Maracanã, Rio de Janeiro was chosen as the 2020 final venue during a meeting of its Council. The Estadio Mario Alberto Kempes in Córdoba, Argentina ended up being selected to host the 2020 Copa Sudamericana Final.

Teams

Road to the final

Note: In all scores below, the score of the home team is given first.

Match

Summary
The most memorable moment is the last 8 minutes of added time in the second half. Santos manager, Cuca, was sent off at 90+6th minute for hassling the ball to delay Palmeiras' throw-in. The only goal of the game came in the 9th minute of second-half stoppage time, from substitute Breno Lopes, scoring with a looping header to the top right corner of the net from seven yards out after a cross from the right by Rony.

Details

See also
2020 Copa Sudamericana Final
2021 Recopa Sudamericana
Clássico da Saudade

References

External links
CONMEBOL Libertadores 2020, CONMEBOL.com

2020
Final
January 2021 sports events in Brazil
January 2021 sports events in South America
International club association football competitions hosted by Brazil
Association football events postponed due to the COVID-19 pandemic
Sociedade Esportiva Palmeiras matches
Santos FC matches
Brazilian football clubs in international competitions